I-365 was an Imperial Japanese Navy Type D1 transport submarine. Completed and commissioned in August 1944, she served in World War II and was sunk while returning from her first transport mission in November 1944.

Construction and commissioning

I-365 was laid down on 15 May 1943 by the Yokosuka Navy Yard at Yokosuka, Japan, with the name Submarine No. 5465. She was renamed I-365 on 20 October 1943 and provisionally attached to the Yokosuka Naval District that day. She was launched on 17 December 1943 and was completed and commissioned on 1 August 1944.

Service history

Upon commissioning, I-365 was attached formally to the Yokosuka Naval District and was assigned to Submarine Squadron 11 for workups. With her workups complete, she was reassigned to Submarine Squadron 7 on 30 September 1944.

On 1 November 1944, I-365 departed Yokosuka bound for Truk on her first transport mission, carrying a cargo of mail and medicine. She reached Truk on 15 November 1944, unloaded her cargo, and embarked 31 passengers. She got back underway on 16 November 1944 with total of 96 passengers and crew aboard bound for the Bonin Islands, intending to proceed to Yokosuka after her stop in the Bonins. She sent a routine signal on 25 November 1944 while east of the Bonins. The Japanese never heard from her again.

Scabbardfish tracked I-365 for three hours before a Japanese aircraft forced her to submerge, but she surfaced and completed an "end-around" maneuver in which she outran I-365 and submerged in a favorable firing position in front of I-365. At 09:40, one of them hit I-365, exploding on her starboard side in her forward battery compartment. Scabbardfish surfaced and found the sea surface covered with oil and debris and five survivors in the water. Four refused rescue and eventually died in the water, but Scabbardfish brought the fifth man aboard. The sole survivor of I-365, he identified his submarine as I-365 to Scabbardfish′s crew.

On 10 December 1944, the Imperial Japanese Navy declared  to be presumed lost off the Bonin Islands. She was stricken from the Navy list on 10 March 1945.

Notes

Sources
 Hackett, Bob & Kingsepp, Sander.  IJN Submarine I-365: Tabular Record of Movement.  Retrieved on September 17, 2020.

Type D submarines
Ships built by Yokosuka Naval Arsenal
1943 ships
World War II submarines of Japan
Japanese submarines lost during World War II
Maritime incidents in November 1944
World War II shipwrecks in the Pacific Ocean
Submarines sunk by submarines
Ships sunk by American submarines